Dale J. Denno (May 1, 1950 – April 16, 2019) was an American politician from Maine.

Biography 
Denno was born on 1 May 1950 in California and raised in New York. Educated at Syracuse University and Cornell Law School, Denno worked for Unum for sixteen years, followed by a stint as assistant attorney general of Maine. He served on the SAD 51 School Board from 1991 to 1997 and was the chair of the school board in 1995 and 1996. Denno later became an instructor at Saint Joseph's College of Maine and manager of the Preble Street Soup Kitchen. He retired from the directorship of the Office for Family Independence within the Maine Department of Health and Human Services in 2013.

Denno contested the open seat of Maine House of Representatives member Steve Moriarty in 2014, losing to Mike Timmons. Denno defeated Timmons in 2016. In November 2018, Denno retained his seat against Republican candidate Tamsin Thomas. Following a diagnosis of lung cancer in 2018, Denno announced that he would resign from the state legislature in March 2019 and endorsed Steve Moriarty. The special election for Denno's legislative seat in district 45 was scheduled for 11 June 2019. Denno died of lung cancer on 16 April 2019, aged 68.

References

1950 births
2019 deaths
Maine lawyers
Deaths from lung cancer
Deaths from cancer in Maine
21st-century American politicians
School board members in Maine
Democratic Party members of the Maine House of Representatives
People from Cumberland, Maine
Saint Joseph's College of Maine people
Cornell Law School alumni
Syracuse University alumni
20th-century American lawyers